Dmytro Lysenko (born 10 May 1981) is a Ukrainian diver who competed in the Men's 3m Springboard event at the Sydney Olympics 2000, the Athens Olympics 2004, and the World Championships in Melbourne 2007. He did not qualify in 2000, but got the 11th position in 2004, and the 9th in 2007.

References
 

1981 births
Living people
Ukrainian male divers
Olympic divers of Ukraine
Divers at the 2000 Summer Olympics
Divers at the 2004 Summer Olympics
Universiade medalists in diving
Universiade bronze medalists for Ukraine
Medalists at the 2007 Summer Universiade